Bob's Lake is a lake in Wollaston, Hastings County in Central Ontario, Canada. It is in the Great Lakes Basin and is part of the Crowe River system. The nearest settlement is Rose Island to the southwest, in the adjacent municipality of North Kawartha in Peterborough County.

Hydrology
The primary outflow, at the southeast, is an unnamed creek that leads to the Crowe River. The Crowe River flows via the Trent River to Lake Ontario.

See also
List of lakes in Ontario

References

Lakes of Hastings County